Group A of the 1997 Fed Cup Europe/Africa Zone Group II was one of four pools in the Europe/Africa zone of the 1996 Fed Cup. Six teams competed in a round robin competition, with the top team advancing to Group I for 1998.

Great Britain vs. Lithuania

Denmark vs. Armenia

Estonia vs. Egypt

Great Britain vs. Egypt

Denmark vs. Estonia

Armenia vs. Lithuania

Great Britain vs. Estonia

Denmark vs. Lithuania

Armenia vs. Egypt

Great Britain vs. Armenia

Denmark vs. Egypt

Estonia vs. Lithuania

Great Britain vs. Estonia

Estonia vs. Armenia

Lithuania vs. Egypt

  placed first in the pool, and thus advanced to Group I in 1998, where they placed third in their group of four.

See also
Fed Cup structure

References

External links
 Fed Cup website

1997 Fed Cup Europe/Africa Zone